Treskerby is a hamlet south of Scorrier in west Cornwall, England, United Kingdom.

References

Hamlets in Cornwall